This is a list of the National Register of Historic Places listings in Eastland County, Texas.

This is intended to be a complete list of properties and districts listed on the National Register of Historic Places in Eastland County, Texas. One district and one individual property are listed on the national register in the county. The individually listed property is a Recorded Texas Historic Landmark (RTHL) and is part of the district, which includes additional RTHLs.

Current listings

The locations of national register properties and districts may be seen in a mapping service provided.

|}

See also

National Register of Historic Places listings in Texas
Recorded Texas Historic Landmarks in Eastland County

References

External links

Eastland County, Texas
Eastland County
Buildings and structures in Eastland County, Texas